Kandeliimicrobium is a Gram-negative genus of bacteria from the family of Rhodobacteraceae with one known species (Kandeliimicrobium roseum). Kandeliimicrobium roseum has been isolated from rhizospheric soil from the  mangrove Kandelia candel from the Mai Po Nature Reserve in Hong Kong.

References

Rhodobacteraceae
Bacteria genera
Monotypic bacteria genera